American Head is the sixteenth studio album by experimental rock band the Flaming Lips, released on September 11, 2020, on Warner Records in the US and Bella Union in the UK. Produced by Dave Fridmann and Scott Booker, alongside the band itself, the album represents a return to the band's American roots. It is the final studio album to feature founding bass guitarist Michael Ivins and keyboardist Jake Ingalls, who both departed from the band in 2021.

It received favorable reviews from critics upon release. Its release was preceded by six singles: "Flowers of Neptune 6", "My Religion Is You", "Dinosaurs on the Mountain", "You n Me Sellin' Weed", "Will You Return / When You Come Down" and "Mother Please Don't Be Sad".

Background
On March 23, 2020, Drozd announced that the band's sixteenth studio album, titled American Head, was due for release that summer. The album represents a shift in identity as the band decided to focus on their American roots on the album. Many of the songs reference Wayne Coyne's turbulent upbringing with his brothers in Oklahoma City. The band officially announced the album's release date as September 11, 2020, along with the single "My Religion Is You" on June 26, 2020. Coyne gave a track-by-track breakdown of the album for Apple Music. The album artwork contains a photograph of Coyne's older brother Tommy, taken around 1970.

Critical reception

At Metacritic, American Head has a score of 81 out of 100, indicating "universal acclaim", based on 20 reviews. Tyler Clark of Consequence of Sound gave the album an A− rating, writing, "American Head stands alongside The Soft Bulletin and Yoshimi Battles the Pink Robots as one of the very best records the Flaming Lips have recorded". Tom Pinnock of Uncut gave the album a 9 out of 10 rating, praising the band for "examining the nature of family, love, death and nostalgia with a sincerity and tenderness that's been missed." Jude Rogers of Mojo praised the tracks "Mother I've Taken LSD", "Mother Please Don't Be Sad", and "Brother Eye", writing, "They suggest a place for the band's psychedelic imagination in more present, physical realms, which feels new."

Year-end lists

Track listing

Personnel
Credits adapted from the album's liner notes.

Performance
The Flaming Lips
 Wayne Coyne
 Steven Drozd
 Michael Ivins
 Derek Brown
 Jake Ingalls
 Matt Kirksey
 Nicholas Ley

Other
 Kacey Musgraves – additional vocals 
 Micah Nelson – additional vocals , additional guitar

Technical
 The Flaming Lips – production, recording, mixing
 Dave Fridmann – production, recording, mixing, mastering
 Scott Booker – production
 Dennis Coyne – recording, mixing, additional production
 Mike Fridmann – additional production

Design
 Kenny Coyne – photography
 George Salisbury – layout, design
 Wayne Coyne – layout, design

Charts

References

External links
  

The Flaming Lips albums
2020 albums
Warner Records albums
Bella Union albums
Albums produced by Dave Fridmann
Albums recorded at Tarbox Road Studios